Level Up is a 2016 British thriller film directed by Adam Randall, starring Josh Bowman, Neil Maskell, William Houston, Kulvinder Ghir, Doc Brown and Leila Mimmack.

Cast
 Josh Bowman as Matt
 Neil Maskell as Dmitri
 William Houston as The Businessman
 Kulvinder Ghir as Osman
 Doc Brown as Joel
 Leila Mimmack as Anna
 Christina Wolfe as Kya
 Paul Reynolds as Taxi Driver
 Cameron Jack as Calvin
 Jonathan Arkwright as Sean
 Leon Annor as Keon
 Pamela Binns as Old Lady
 Okorie Chukwu as Hoodie
 Jack Fox as Steve
 Manpreet Bachu as Jamz
 Rina Takasaki as Karaoke Receptionist
 Samuel Fava as Beggar

Release
The film was released in the United States on 26 August 2016.

Reception
Frank Scheck of The Hollywood Reporter wrote that the film "achieves most of its tension thanks to the pulsing musical score by the British electronic duo Plaid", and while the screenplay "admirably stresses action over dialogue", it "falls somewhat short in the clarity department." He also praised Bowman's performance, writing that he "well fulfills the considerable physical demands of his everyman role, engaging our sympathy with his less than macho responses to the dangers with which he’s faced."

Pete Vonder Haar of The Village Voice wrote that Randall "keeps the action tightly paced and the dialogue to a refreshing minimum, helping to heighten Matt’s growing isolation."

Dennis Harvey of Variety wrote that while the film is "admirable as a demonstration of resourcefulness within modest budget confines", and is "watchable enough", it "fails to come up with anything original or memorable in the realms of plotting, atmosphere, or character invention.".

Jeannette Catsoulis of The New York Times wrote that while Randall "shows some aptitude for the tease and for maintaining a stranglehold on the movie’s sourly cynical tone", while Bolten "gives key indoor scenes a bilious menace", the film "requires a lead with considerably more charisma and skills than Mr. Bowman."

References

External links
 
 

British thriller films
2016 thriller films
2016 films